Tskaltubo ( in English also commonly referred to as "Tskaltubo") is a spa resort in west-central Georgia. It is the main town of the Tsqaltubo Municipality of the Imereti province. It is known for its radon-carbonate mineral springs, whose natural temperature of  enables the water to be used without preliminary heating.

The resort's focus is on balneotherapy for circulatory, nervous, musculo-skeletal, gynaecological and skin diseases, but since the 1970s its repertoire has included "speleotherapy", in which the cool dust-free environment of local caves is said to benefit pulmonary diseases.

Tskaltubo was especially popular in the Soviet era, attracting around 125,000 visitors a year. Bathhouse 9 features a frieze of Stalin, and visitors can see the private pool where he bathed on his visits.

Currently the spa receives only some 700 visitors a year, however, there are numerous restoration projects to promote the regeneration of this historic spa town.

Geography
Tskaltubo is located in the central part of west Georgia, in the lowland, at the foot of the Southern Caucasus, 98 meters above the sea-level, in the valley of the river Tskaltubo. It is located 9 km away from Kutaisi and 240 km from the Georgian capital Tbilisi. The climate in Tskaltubo is warm and moderately mild. The average annual temperature is +15C, and average annual precipitation is 76%. Winters here are warm and mild.

Tskaltubo is rich with karst caves. Such as “Satsurblia", "Prometheus" and "Sataplia" which provide visitors with breathtaking examples of stalactites, stalagmites, curtains, petrified waterfalls, cave pearls, underground rivers, and lakes. The temperature in the cave is always 13-15C.

Satsurblia cave is the first and only Speleotherapic - object in the Caucasus Region. The cave has unique climatic environment that gives it the ability be transformed to a recreational tourism destination for individuals with respiratory diseases ( e.g. Bronchial asthma, etc.). Speleotherapy, or underground climate-therapy, is a set of recreational therapy methods based on the use of underground microclimate to improve health.

Prometheus cave is one of the longest caves in Georgia. Visitors can see halls of Argonauts, Colchis, Medea, Love, and Prometheus and of Iberia, the excursion can be finished by foot or by a 15-minute boat ride an underground river.

Sataplia reserve is known for its footprints of dinosaurs. The reserve also has a karst caves. There is a transparent platform that gives views of the area.

Architecture
Another factor in Tskaltubo is its architecture which is basically a synthesis of Stalinist period classical style and of Georgian ethnic decor with Gothic and Roman features.

History

The "Waters of Immortality" in Tskaltubo were probably known already in the 7th-9th centuries, when the oldest historical records are dated. Since the 18th century several foreign researchers gave word of the healing properties of these springs:Berlin Society of Friends of Natural Science (1782); J.Klaproth (1815); A. Jolenberg (1897). By 1920, after chemical analysis had revealed the uniqueness of the water, Tskaltubo was officially declared a medical spa resort and achieve the status of city in 1953.

In 1920 the territory of Tskaltubo became state property and it acquired the function of balneology resort. The building of the resort started in 1926. In 1931, a decree by the government of Georgian Soviet Republic designed Tskaltubo as a spa resort and balneology center.

In 1950-1951, architects I.Zaalishvili and V.Kedia prepared a project plan for the town where sanatoriums form a circle around a park, recreation and balneology facilities. Tskaltubo was divided into the following zones: balneological, sanitarian and living.

In 1953, Tskaltubo became the important spa-resort during the Soviet times. At different times, there were built 19 sanatoriums and pensions, nine baths, resort park, Branch of Scientific Institute of balneology and physiotherapy.

As one of Georgia's flagship historic spa towns, the town is still popular for the qualities of its waters. Tskaltubo mineral waters are famous for their stable physical and chemical composition and they are categorized as slight radon chloride –magnesium waters. The high-performance spa preventive effect of mineral waters is conditioned by their complex content and particular fusion of salt components. In Tskaltubo the bath taking has a peculiar technique, the treatment take place under the constant running water ( mineral water constantly flows in and out of the spa) and the water permanently preserves physical-chemical and mineral compositions. The water consists of six components and it penetrates into the human body via pores. Constituent ingredients in number are far below the permissible minimum, temperature of water is 33-35 C, it is very soft, pure and odorless.

Visitor numbers to Tsqaltubo dwindled after the dissolution of the Soviet Union, and currently the spa town only receives approximately 700 visitors a year. Since 1993 many of the sanatorium complexes have been devoted to housing some 9000 refugees, primarily women and children, displaced from their homes by the conflict in nearby Abkhazia.

There have been a number of plans and projects to renovate and reconstitute Tskaltubo as a major resort.

Mineral water baths
The unique radon-carbonated waters are Tskaltubo's major mineral resource. They emerge at a comfortable temperature for bathing (35 °C), allowing them to be directly transferred from springs to the baths without cooling or heating.

The "Spring No. 6", is the largest thermal bath working today. It was built in 1950 exclusively for Joseph Stalin, leader of the Soviet Union at the time. Private baths and dachas of Stalin and Lavrenti Beria are still kept in the city. The mineral water flows directly into Buildings #1 and #6. There are five pools of mineral water, 37 individual cabins for bathing mineral water and 17 hydro-massage cabinets.

Sport
Samgurali Tsqaltubo, founded in 1945, is one the country's top football teams.

See also
 Imereti

References

External links

Russians seeking sun, sea and cures. New York Times (July 16, 1982)

Cities and towns in Imereti
Kutaisi Governorate
Spa towns in Georgia (country)
Natural environment based therapies
Populated places in Tsqaltubo Municipality
Refugee camps in Europe